Masabumi (written: 雅章 or 正文) is a masculine Japanese given name. Notable people with the name include:

, Japanese civil servant and RMS Titanic passenger
, Japanese jazz pianist and composer

Japanese masculine given names